Thomas E. Atkins (February 5, 1921 – September 15, 1999) was a Private in the United States Army who received the Medal of Honor for actions in World War II during a skirmish on 10 March 1945 in the Battle of Luzon.

He joined the Army from his birth town in December 1942.

Medal of Honor citation

After the war
Atkins retired from the army and settled in his home town of Campobello, South Carolina where he eventually became a farmer. He died on 15 September 1999, from congestive heart failure.

See also

List of Medal of Honor recipients for World War II

References

External links

1921 births
1999 deaths
United States Army Medal of Honor recipients
United States Army soldiers
United States Army personnel of World War II
World War II recipients of the Medal of Honor
People from Spartanburg County, South Carolina